Sam Hamad (born June 17, 1958) is a Canadian politician. He is the former member of National Assembly (MNA) for the riding of Louis-Hebert in the Quebec City region. Member of the Quebec Liberal Party, he was the Minister for Transports and he was also the Minister of Employment and Social Solidarity, Minister of Labour and Minister responsible for the Capitale-Nationale region

Biography

Early years and education
Born in Damascus, Syria, Hamad moved to Quebec City and studied civil engineering at Université Laval where he received both a bachelor's and master's degree. He also studied at the Université du Québec à Trois-Rivières where he obtained a master's degree in management. His birth name was Samer Hamed-Allah but he changed it when he moved to Quebec, saying that Samer sounded too much like the French words "sa mère" (meaning "his mother").

Career
He was an administration member for the Ordre des Ingénieurs du Québec for nine years, while he was also a lecturer at Université Laval and the Université du Québec à Rimouski and the President of the Quebec Board of Trade and Industry.

He was also involved in the community, being the vice-president of Centraide-Quebec a board member of the Laval Hospital Foundation. He was also part of several associations promoting development in the region including the GATIQ which promoted advance technologies and innovations for the region.

Before making his foray into politics, Hamad was Vice-President of Groupe Roche, an influential engineering firm, from 1998 to 2003.

Politics
Hamed entered politics in 2003, where he became the MNA for Louis-Hebert as the Liberals led by Jean Charest defeated the Parti Québécois. He would be named Minister of Wildlife, Natural Resources and Parks and the Minister responsible for the Capitale-Nationale (Quebec) region. He was removed from Cabinet in 2005 after he was criticized in regard to a project which would have added a new thermo plant in the Suroit region.

Hamad was narrowly re-elected in 2007. Initially, it was thought that the Action démocratique du Québec won the seat but late ballots pushed Hamad to a late-victory and no recounts were made. As he was only one of two Liberal MNAs elected in the Quebec City region (the other being Philippe Couillard), Hamad was named the Minister of Employment and Social Solidarity until where he was named Minister of Transports, swapping portfolios with Julie Boulet. Briefly in 2010, he also held the Labour portfolio after David Whissell resigned his position following conflict of interest allegations.

He returned to the Labour portfolio on April 23, 2014.

He announced his resignation as an MNA on April 27, 2017.

References

External links
 

1958 births
Living people
Members of the Executive Council of Quebec
Canadian people of Syrian descent
Francophone Quebec people
Politicians from Damascus
Quebec Liberal Party MNAs
Syrian emigrants to Canada
Université Laval alumni
Université du Québec à Trois-Rivières alumni
21st-century Canadian politicians
Canadian politicians of Syrian descent